The Basilique Notre-Dame de la Délivrance (Basilica of Our Lady of Deliverance) is a Roman Catholic  minor basilica dedicated to the Blessed Virgin Mary located in Popenguine, Senegal.  The basilica is falls under the jurisdiction of the Archdiocese of Dakar.  The basilica was dedicated on November 23, 1991.

References

Basilica churches in Africa
Roman Catholic churches in Senegal